Christian Moser (born 20 December 1972 in Wiesbaden) is an Austrian former ski jumper who competed from 1990 to 1997. At the 1994 Winter Olympics of Lillehammer, he won a bronze medal in the Team Large Hill.

Moser's best World Cup finish was a second place in the Individual Normal Hill in 1994.

External links 
 
 

Austrian male ski jumpers
Olympic ski jumpers of Austria
Olympic bronze medalists for Austria
Ski jumpers at the 1994 Winter Olympics
1972 births
Living people
Olympic medalists in ski jumping
Medalists at the 1994 Winter Olympics
20th-century Austrian people